Sebastia is a monotypic tiger moth genus in the family Erebidae described by William Forsell Kirby in 1892. Its only species, Sebastia argus, was first described by Francis Walker in 1862. It can be found in Yunnan and Bangladesh.

References

Callimorphina
Moths described in 1862
Monotypic moth genera
Moths of Asia